William Worth may refer to:

William Worth (Irish judge) (c. 1646–1721), Irish judge
William Worth (scholar) (1677–1742), English classical scholar and divine
William J. Worth (1794–1849), United States general
William Worth (minister) (1745–1808), controversial Baptist minister in New Jersey
William Worth (diplomat) (born 1912), Australian diplomat